The Watertown Commercial Historic District is a  historic district in Watertown, South Dakota.  It is roughly bounded by First Ave. N., Third St. E., Second Ave. S., and First St. W.

It includes works by Watertown architect Maurice A. Hockman.

It includes 69 contributing buildings and 47 non-contributing ones.

It includes the Codington County Courthouse and the Carnegie Free Public Library, which are separately listed on the National Register.

References

Historic districts on the National Register of Historic Places in South Dakota
Neoclassical architecture in South Dakota
Chicago school architecture in the United States
Buildings and structures completed in 1936
Codington County, South Dakota